Hill House School is a co-educational independent school for pupils from the ages of 3 to 18 in South Yorkshire, England. In 2012, Hill House was named 'independent school of the Year' at the independent school awards. It is a member of Headmasters' and Headmistresses' Conference, The Society of Heads, The Independent Association of Preparatory Schools, and the Independent Schools Council.

Early History

Hill House School was founded in Doncaster as a preparatory school for boys in 1912 by Reginald Master. In 1959, Paula Haigh, the wife of the then Headmaster of Hill House School, Mr Hamilton Haigh, founded St Mary's School on Bawtry Road as a girls' school. In the early 1970s under a new head, Hill House began to accept girls, and by the early 1980s had become fully co-educational.

Hill House St Mary's School was born when the two schools merged in August 2002, with primary age children being taught at the Rutland Street site, overlooking Doncaster's Town Fields, and with secondary age children taught at the St Mary's site on Bawtry Road.

Recent History

In September 2008, Hill House School, reverting to its former name, relocated to the Officers’ Quarters of former RAF Finningley, previous home to Britain's Vulcan bombers, adjacent to the modern Robin Hood Airport. In an £8 million project, led by Cadman Construction, the school now has numerous purpose built classrooms allied to historic function rooms. In September 2011, Hill House opened its new Sixth Form and Music School in a £1.1 million development, and was accepted into membership of the Society of Heads.

Since 2010, Hill House has been home to the Robin Hood Music and Drama Festival, which takes place in April each year. In 2012, the school acquired 54 acres of land in nearby Blaxton, which has been developed into sports grounds.

In September 2015, having acquired 3 further pieces of land adjacent to the main site, the school's new Paver Hockey pitch was opened by Imran Sherwani, Olympic gold medallist, with Hill House becoming the first independent school in the North of England to possess a blue astroturf pitch.

In February 2015, the school renewed its RAF past by becoming the base of 558 Finningley Squadron of the Air Training Corps

In April 2017, the school's new £1 million Dining Hall was opened.

In October 2020, the school issued an apology in response to a satirical Tiktok video showing several Hill House students lip-syncing to a song as part of a popular Tiktok challenge.

In August 2021, the school celebrated record examination results and Oxbridge admissions.

In July 2022, the Headmaster, David Holland, was accepted into membership of HMC

Catchment
The main catchment area includes Tickhill, Bawtry, Epworth, Doncaster, Rotherham, Howden, Selby, Retford & Worksop, all of which are served by school transport.

Houses
The School has 4 Houses, School (Blue), Master (Red), Field (Green), New (Purple)

House Music Champions

2022 Master
2021 New
2019 School
2018 New
2017 Master
2017 Field
2016 Field
2015 Field
2014 School
2013 School
2012 School

House Relay Champions
2021 Field
2019 School
2018 Field
2017 Field
2016 Field
2015 Field
2014 Field

Awards

2012–13 Times Independent School of the Year; Winner
2012–13 Times Outstanding Strategic Initiative Award: Winner
2012–13   Times Outstanding Governing Body Award; Shortlist
2016–17   Times Outstanding Community Initiative Award; Winner
2021-22   Independent School of the Year for Sport; Shortlist

Successes

2016–17   North of England Hockey Champions, 5th in National Finals, at U13 Girls
2017–18   North of England Hockey Runners-up, 7th in National Finals, at U14 Girls
2021-22   North of England Tier 4 Hockey Champions at U18 Girls
2021-22   National Tier 4 Hockey Runners Up at U18 Girls
2021-22   U16 Boys Rugby Yorkshire Cup Winners
2021-22   U15 Boys England National Rugby Bowl Winners
2022-23   North of England Tier 4 Hockey Champions at U18 Girls

Notable former pupils

Jeremy Clarkson, author, journalist and television presenter
Emma Chambers, actress
Rosie Winterton, Member of Parliament
Philip Davies, Member of Parliament
Richard Dawson, England cricketer; Gloucestershire Cricket Club head coach 
Michael Hills, rugby player (England U21 + 7s: Sale, London Welsh, & Doncaster (Captain))
Jonathan Wood, former Doncaster councillor
Robert Hannigan, civil servant, director of GCHQ
John Craig Lawrence, director of joint warfare in the Joint Forces Command, author, historian
Hannah Cain, professional footballer with Wales and Leicester City W.F.C
Francis Hodder, first-class cricketer, rugby union player and Royal Air Force officer
 Andy Wilman, Producer of the popular motorshow Top Gear
 Adrian Newey, Formula 1 aerodynamasist

References

External links
 Independent Schools Council
 Doncaster Free Press
 BBC News
 Independent Schools Awards
 Society of Heads
 IAPS

Private schools in Doncaster

Educational institutions established in 1912
1912 establishments in England
Auckley